Auguste Belloc (1800, Montrabé – 1867, Paris) was a French photographer, known for his erotic works.  He was born in Montrabé, and died in Paris. Belloc began his career as a painter of miniatures and watercolors. Belloc's first photographic studio was mentioned in 1851. Belloc practiced daguerreotype, he became involved in wet collodion development and improved the wax coating process, helping the photos to keep their wet-like luster.

Belloc led important research about color stereoscopy (3-dimensional photography).

References

External links 
 
 
 Auguste BELLOC
 Auguste Belloc (French, −1867) 
 Auguste Belloc 

1800 births
1867 deaths
French photographers